Kaya Tanada Hawkinson (born April 17, 2000) is a footballer who plays as a midfielder or a defender for Cal State Fullerton Titans. Born in the United States, she represents the Philippines women's national team.

Early life
Hawkinson was born in Torrance, California and raised in Rancho Palos Verdes, California. She attended high school in Palos Verdes High School.

Club career

Youth
Hawkinson had her youth career in LA Galaxy.

College career
Hawkinson has played collegiate soccer at California State University, Fullerton.

International career
Hawkinson was born in the United States to an American father and a Filipina mother, which made her eligible to represent the United States and Philippines at international level.

Philippines
Hawkinson was included in the Philippines squad for a month-long training camp in Australia. The training camp was part of the national team's preparation for the 2021 Southeast Asian Games held in Hanoi, Vietnam.

She made her debut for the Philippines in an 8–0 win against Fiji, coming in as a substitute replacing Anicka Castañeda in the 46th minute.

Hawkinson scored her first international goal for the Philippines in a 7–0 win against Singapore in the 2022 AFF Women's Championship.

International goals
Scores and results list the Philippines' goal tally first.

Honours

International

Philippines
Southeast Asian Games third place: 2021
AFF Women's Championship: 2022

References

Living people
Citizens of the Philippines through descent
Filipino women's footballers
Women's association football defenders
Women's association football midfielders
Philippines women's international footballers
American women's soccer players
Soccer players from California
Cal State Fullerton Titans women's soccer players
American people of Filipino descent
American sportspeople of Filipino descent
2000 births
Southeast Asian Games bronze medalists for the Philippines
Southeast Asian Games medalists in football
Competitors at the 2021 Southeast Asian Games